Austrobrickellia is a genus of flowering plants in the family Asteraceae.

 Species
Austrobrickellia is native to southern South America.
 Austrobrickellia arnottii (Baker) R.M.King & H.Rob.	- Paraguay, northern Argentina
 Austrobrickellia bakerianum (B.L.Rob.) R.M.King & H.Rob.- Rio Grande do Sul
 Austrobrickellia patens (D.Don ex Hook. & Arn.) R.M.King & H.Rob. - Argentina, Bolivia, Paraguay, Rio Grande do Sul

References

Asteraceae genera
Flora of South America
Eupatorieae